Caddy is a surname. Notable people with the surname include:

 Alan Caddy (1940–2000), guitarist in the 1960s British instrumental band The Tornados
 Benjamin Jennings Caddy (1881–1955), South African trade unionist 
 Caroline Caddy (born 1944), Australian poet 
 Dorian Caddy (born 1995), French footballer
 Douglas Caddy, American lawyer
 Eileen Caddy (1917–2006), one of the founders of the Findhorn Foundation community 
 Florence Caddy (1837–1923), English writer
 George Caddy (1914–1983), Australian dancer and photographer
 Jo Caddy (1916–2006), Australian-American painter and ceramicist
 John Caddy, American poet and naturalist
 Joseph Caddy (1885–1946), English footballer
 Josh Caddy (born 1992), Australian rules footballer
 Peter Caddy (1917—1994), British caterer and hotelier, and founder of the Findhorn Foundation community
 Warren Caddy (born 1997), French footballer
 William R. Caddy (1925–1945), United States Marine and Medal of Honor recipient

See also 

Caddy (name)
 Cady (disambiguation)